The Volvo Open di Firenze was a men's professional golf tournament on the European Tour which was played in Italy from 1989 to 1992.

The first edition took place in Sardinia and was called the Volvo Open Championship, with the other three taking place in Florence, and being named for that city.

The most notable winner was future World Number 1 Vijay Singh of Fiji, whose victory in 1989 was his first on the European Tour, and the most prestigious of his career up to that date.

In its final year the prize fund was £225,000, which was one of the smallest on the European Tour that year.

Winners

External links
Coverage on the European Tour's official site

Former European Tour events
Golf tournaments in Italy
Recurring sporting events established in 1989
Recurring events disestablished in 1992
1989 establishments in Italy
1992 disestablishments in Italy
Defunct sports competitions in Italy